Mulleya Mulleya (also known as Spinning the Tales of Cruelty Towards Women), is a 1984 South Korean film directed by Lee Doo-yong. It was chosen as Best Film at the Grand Bell Awards. It was screened in the Un Certain Regard section of the 1984 Cannes Film Festival. The film was also selected as the South Korean entry for the Best Foreign Language Film at the 57th Academy Awards, but was not accepted as a nominee.

Plot
A historical drama about the life of a widow. 15th century life was sometimes cruel to Korean women and this story depicts a lot of the injustices that could occur as happening to Kil-Rye, the heroine.

Cast
 Won Mi-kyung: Gillye
 Shin Il-ryong: Yun-bo
 Moon Jung-suk: Mother
 Choe Sung-kwan: Father
 Park Min-ho
 Choe Seong-ho
 Moon Mi-bong
 Yang Chun
 Hyun Kill-soo
 Choe Jeong-won

Critical reception
Comment on contemporary reactions to this film: There was a great deal of controversy in the Korean media when this film came out, saying that this work did not represent Korea well. Some objected to the shade of the lead actress' skin, saying that she looked too dark for a Korean. Whiteness of skin was and is still considered important among many in Korea.

Others scoffed that it was unlikely that all of the injustices depicted could have happened to one woman. However, it is a vivid and visually spectacular depiction of the struggles many women went through in that time period.

The film also polarized audiences and stirred controversy when it was shown at the East-West Center and the Fifth International Film Festival in Honolulu.

See also
 List of submissions to the 57th Academy Awards for Best Foreign Language Film
 List of South Korean submissions for the Academy Award for Best Foreign Language Film

References

Notes

Bibliography

External links
 
 

1984 films
1980s historical drama films
Films set in the Joseon dynasty
Films directed by Lee Doo-yong
Best Picture Grand Bell Award winners
1980s Korean-language films
South Korean historical drama films
1984 drama films